Burbur-e Olya (also Romanized as Būrbūr-e ‘Olyā) is a village in Kakavand-e Gharbi Rural District, Kakavand District, Delfan County, Lorestan Province, Iran. At the 2006 census, its population was 179, in 33 families.

References 

Towns and villages in Delfan County